Sudheer Varma is an Indian film director and writer who works predominantly in Telugu cinema. He made his directorial debut with the film Swamy Ra Ra (2013). He later directed films such as Dochay (2015), Keshava (2017), and Ranarangam (2019).

Early life 
Sudheer Varma was born on 6 October 1979 in Bhimavaram. Varma was schooled in Visakhapatnam and completed his intermediate in Kakinada. He grew up in Narasapuram. He was an Electronics and Communication Engineer by profession. He started his career as an assistant director.

Varma is married to Radha Kumari and the couple are with two children..

Career
Sudheer Varma released his debut directorial venture Swamy Ra Ra (2013), starring Nikhil Siddharth and Swathi Reddy. The Hindu stated that "the film will pick-pocket your brain and you'll most probably end up feeling richer, if not a millionaire." It was commercially successful at the box office. The film was remade in Kannada as Jamboo Savari.

Varma's second film was Dohchay (2015), starring Naga Chaitanya and Kriti Sanon. He later directed Keshava (2017) with Nikhil Siddharth, Ritu Varma, and Isha Kopikar in the lead roles.

Style and influences 
Talking about his style Sudheer shared, "I'm influenced largely by foreign films. I am a huge fan of Quentin Tarantino, Christopher Nolan, Steven Spielberg, and Martin Scorsese. Their work has been very important to me, in regards to my learning. As for my style, whenever I do a film, I watch a lot of films from the same genre. If I see anything interesting, I adapt it. The story structure is mine and in place even before I've thought of possible inspirations. After that, I might adapt some scenes in my films, from others. Still, I do the screenplay to suit our audience. I don't want the audience to get disconnected from my film, so I make sure our audience relate to it."

In another interview he said, "According to me, inspiration or copying, both are the same. That's why I give credit to the directors from whom I steal the scenes. Keshava too, is inspired from several films, but not any one particular film. So, in the special thanks card, I mentioned each director from whose films I took inspiration for Keshava. This is my way of paying tribute to the scenes that have left a great impact on me. My favourite Indian directors are Mani Ratnam, Ram Gopal Varma, Rajkumar Santoshi, and Rajkumar Hirani."

Filmography

References

External links
 

20th-century births
Telugu screenwriters
Telugu film directors
Film directors from Andhra Pradesh
People from West Godavari district
21st-century Indian film directors
Screenwriters from Andhra Pradesh
Year of birth missing (living people)